Pyroloideae is a subfamily of plants in the family Ericaceae. It was formerly treated as a separate family, Pyrolaceae. It has also been treated as the tribe Pyroleae within the subfamily Monotropoideae. It consists of four genera: Chimaphila containing 5 species, Pyrola containing 30 species and Moneses and Orthilia which are monotypic. They are mixotrophic, gaining nutrition from photosynthesis, but also from mycorrhizal fungi.

Genera list

References

 
Asterid subfamilies